Storwood is a hamlet and former civil parish, now in the parish of Cottingwith, East Riding of Yorkshire, England. In 1931 the civil parish had a population of 63. On 1 April 1935 the civil parish was merged with East Cottingwith to create Cottingwith.

References

Hamlets in the East Riding of Yorkshire
Former civil parishes in the East Riding of Yorkshire